José Rolando Torres Mendoza (born 21 December 1982 in Jocoro, El Salvador) is a Salvadoran professional footballer who played as a defender.

Club career
Torres came through at local side Atlético Morazán and has played professionally for Fuerte San Francisco of the Salvadoran Third Division. He then had a couple of years at the country's top level, with  Águila and Alianza, before joining Municipal in 2009. He rejoined Águila for the 2012 Clausura.

International career
Torres made his debut for El Salvador in an October 2006 friendly match against Panama and has earned a total of 13 caps, scoring no goals. He has represented his country at the 2007 UNCAF Nations Cup and was a non-playing squad member at the 2007 CONCACAF Gold Cup.

His final international game was an August 2008 friendly match against Trinidad & Tobago.

References

External links

1982 births
Living people
People from Morazán Department
Association football defenders
Salvadoran footballers
El Salvador international footballers
2007 UNCAF Nations Cup players
2007 CONCACAF Gold Cup players
C.D. Águila footballers
Alianza F.C. footballers

es:José Mendoza Posas